Loch Quoich (Scottish Gaelic: Loch Chuaich) is a loch and reservoir situated west of Loch Garry approximately 40 km northwest of Fort William, Lochaber, Scotland. The name means "loch of the quaich". In 1896, it was listed as six miles long and three-quarters of a mile in width, belonging to Mrs. Ellice of Glenquoich, within the parish of Kilmonivaig.

Both lochs form part of the Glen Garry hydroelectricity project commissioned by the North of Scotland Hydro-Electric Board in the 1950s.

The scheme was completed in 1962.

Geology 
The Loch Quoich Line is a fault line extending for over 60 kilometres within the Moine Thrust Belt. In 1980, the mineral johnsomervilleite, a transition-metal phosphate, was found in the Loch Quoich area.

On 10 November 2018, a landslide at Loch Quoich near Kinloch Hourn destroyed a pylon and knocked out power for 20,000 homes; telephones service was also interrupted. The landslide, which dislocated 9,000 tonnes, blocked road access until mid-2019.

Gallery

See also 
List of reservoirs and dams in the United Kingdom

References

External links

Lochs of Highland (council area)
Reservoirs in Highland (council area)
Freshwater lochs of Scotland